Nephi Tupou Leatigaga (born 5 December 1993) is a Samoan rugby union prop for Leicester Tigers in England's Premiership Rugby, the top tier. He has previously played for Biarritz Olympique in France's Pro D2 and for Piacenza in Italy.

Career
Leatigaga was born in Samoa; he first played for Mt Wellington RFC and Auckland Rugby Union in New Zealand. After impressing for Samoa 'A' he was called up for 's November 2016 touring squad. He made his international debut on 25 November 2016 against  in a 25-23 win at the Stade des Alpes in  Grenoble, France.  On 18 January 2017 he joined Rugby Lyons Piacenza in Italy's Super 10   On 15 June 2017 his signature was announced by Biarritz Olympique. After a season in France his signature for Leicester was widely reported in the French media in July 2018, which prompted Biarritz to release a statement claiming his agent was unregistered which the agent denied, saying he was registered with the RFU allowing him to sign the player to an English club.

His signing for the 2019-20 season was confirmed by Leicester Tigers on 6 May 2019. Leatigaga played as a replacement in the 2022 Premiership Rugby final as Tigers beat Saracens 15-12.

References

Samoan rugby union players
1993 births
Living people
Biarritz Olympique players
Rugby union props
Leicester Tigers players
Samoa international rugby union players